Ambushed may refer to:

 Ambushed (album), a 1994 album by Da Bush Babees
 Ambushed (2013 film), a 2013 film directed by Giorgio Serafini and starring Dolph Lundgren
 Ambushed (1998 film), a 1998 American action thriller film
 "Ambushed," a song by French electronic group Telepopmusik from their album Angel Milk

See also 
 Ambush (disambiguation)